Il is a Korean given name and name element. Its meaning differs based on the hanja used to write it.

Hanja
There are ten hanja with this reading on the South Korean government's official list of hanja which may be registered for use in given names; they are:

 (한 일 han il): one
 (날 일 nal il): sun, day
 (달아날 일 doranal il): escape
 (넘칠 일 neomchil il): overflow
 (무게 이름 일 muge ireum il): unit of weight
 (역말 일 yeongmal il): post horse
 (줄 춤 일 jul chum il): row of dancers
 (편안할 일 pananhal il): comfortable, indulgent
 (한 일 han il): one (complex form)
 (기쁠 일 gibbeul il): happiness

People
People with the single-syllable given name Il include:
Yi Il (1538–1601), Joseon Dynasty general
Kim Il (politician) (1910–1984), Premier of North Korea from 1972 to 1976
Nam Il (1915–1976), North Korean general
Kim Il (1929–2006), Japanese name Kintaro Ohki, Japanese wrestler of Korean descent
Bak Il (born 1949), South Korean voice actor
Il Lee (born 1952), South Korean-born American visual artist
Kim Il (pentathlete) (born 1962), South Korean pentathlete
Won Il (born 1967), South Korean musician
Kim Il (wrestler) (born 1971), North Korean wrestler
Yoo Il (born Park Sang-il, 1990), South Korean actor

As a given name element
One name containing this element, Il-sung, was a popular name in Korea in the 1940s, according to South Korean government data. Other names containing this element include:

Dong-il
Hae-il
Jong-il
Jung-il
Nam-il
Sung-il
Tae-il
Won-il
Ji-il

See also
List of Korean given names

References

Korean given names
Korean masculine given names